Ceratozamia mexicana is a species of plant in the family Zamiaceae.

It is endemic to Hidalgo, Puebla, Querétaro, San Luis Potosí, and Veracruz states in Mexico. Its natural habitats are subtropical or tropical moist lowland forests and subtropical or tropical moist montane forests. It is threatened by habitat loss.

Gallery

References

mexicana
Endemic flora of Mexico
Flora of Hidalgo (state)
Flora of Puebla
Flora of Querétaro
Flora of San Luis Potosí
Flora of Veracruz
Taxonomy articles created by Polbot
Plants described in 1846
Taxa named by Adolphe-Théodore Brongniart